The Steyr TMP (Taktische Maschinenpistole/Tactical Machine Pistol) is a 9×19mm Parabellum caliber machine pistol manufactured by Steyr Mannlicher of Austria. The magazines come in 15-, 20-, or 30-round detachable box types. A suppressor can also be fitted.

In 2001, Steyr sold the design to Brügger & Thomet, who developed it into the Brügger & Thomet MP9.

SPP

The Steyr SPP (Special Purpose Pistol) is a semi-automatic variant of the TMP. The TMP's barrel and barrel jacket lengths were increased slightly so there is a greater length of protruding jacket and barrel. The forward tactical pistol grip was also removed. It is large for a pistol and is constructed mainly from Polyamide 66.

Users

: Used by EKO Cobra.
: Used by the Gruppo di Intervento Speciale.
 : Manufactured locally as MA-13 MK-II.
 : Used by FSB Alpha counterterrorist unit.

See also
 Beretta 93R
 Brügger & Thomet MP9
 Heckler & Koch VP70
 KGP-9
 BXP
 Patria
 PP-2000

References

External links
 Steyr TMP at Modern Firearms
 Patent

9mm Parabellum submachine guns
9mm Parabellum machine pistols
Submachine guns of Austria
Steyr Mannlicher
Weapons and ammunition introduced in 1992